Wilfred Mugeyi (born 4 July 1969) is a Zimbabwean former footballer whose last job was coach at South African Premier Soccer League club AmaZulu FC.

During his playing days he was known as "Silver Fox" for the way he stole un-noticed behind opposition defences.
 
He enjoyed a long and fruitful spell at South African side Bush Bucks, a club he first joined in 1993, and also a decent international career with Zimbabwe.

Mugeyi took South African football by storm when he scooped three top awards, PSL Player of the Year, Player's Player of the Year and Top Goalscorer of the Season back in 1996/97 when he scored 23 goals for Bucks.
	
He has also had spells in Israel and China, where he played for Maccabi Haifa and Shenyang Haishi respectively.
 
His twin brother William Mugeyi was also a professional footballer who played for Bush Bucks and Zimbabwe.
 
Since 2007 after retiring from professional football as a player, Wilfred Mugeyi became an assistant coach at his former club Ajax Cape Town having served as an assistant to Craig Rosslee, Muhsin Ertuğral, Foppe de Haan and finally Maarten Stekelenburg.

On 2 October 2012, Wilfred Mugeyi briefly took over as interim Manager of Ajax Cape Town, following the dismissal of Maarten Stekelenburg, before himself being relieved by Jan Pruijn and finally Jan Versleijen to conclude the 2012/13 PSL season for Ajax CT.
 	
On 29 January 2013 it was announced that Wilfred Mugeyi would take over as head coach of Chippa United.

On 12 December 2014 Wilfred left AmaZulu as manager of the club.

External links

References

1969 births
Living people
Zimbabwean footballers
Zimbabwe international footballers
Zimbabwean expatriate footballers
Maccabi Haifa F.C. players
Expatriate footballers in Israel
Bush Bucks F.C. players
Zimbabwean football managers
Free State Stars F.C. players
Cape Town Spurs F.C. players
Ajax Cape Town F.C. managers
AmaZulu F.C. managers
Zimbabwean expatriate sportspeople in China
Association football forwards
Expatriate footballers in China
Changsha Ginde players
Expatriate soccer players in South Africa
Zimbabwean expatriate sportspeople in South Africa
2004 African Cup of Nations players
Zimbabwean twins
Twin sportspeople
Sportspeople from Harare
Liga Leumit players
Zimbabwean expatriate football managers